General elections were held in India in 1991 to elect the members of the 10th Lok Sabha. Voter turnout was the lowest ever in parliamentary elections. No party could muster a majority in the Lok Sabha, hence INC formed a minority government with the support of other parties, resulting in a stable government for the next 5 years under the new Prime Minister P. V. Narasimha Rao.

BJP wins 20 seats, Congress wins 5 seats and JD (G) wins only one seat.

Party-wise results summary

Results- Constituency wise

References

Indian general elections in Gujarat
Gujarat
1990s in Gujarat